This is a list of Estonian television related events from 2000.

Events
5 February - Ines is selected to represent Estonia at the 2000 Eurovision Song Contest with her song "Once in a Lifetime". She is selected to be the sixth Estonian Eurovision entry during Eurolaul held at the ETV Studios in Tallinn.

Debuts

International
 Garfield and Friends (TV3)

Television shows

1990s
Õnne 13 (1993–present)

Ending this year

Births

Deaths
28 October - Aare Laanemets (born 1954), actor